Eman Fiala (15 April 1899 – 24 June 1970) was a Czechoslovak film actor and composer. He appeared in more than 160 films between 1918 and 1966.

Selected filmography

 Little Red Riding Hood (1920)
 Tu ten kámen (1923)
 The Lantern (1925)
 Affair at the Grand Hotel (1929)
 Father Vojtech (1929)
 Černé oči, proč pláčete...? (1930)
 Imperial and Royal Field Marshal (1930)
 Chudá holka (1930)
 Business Under Distress (1931)
 Muži v offsidu (1931)
 The Inspector General (1933)
 Hrdinný kapitán Korkorán (1934)
 Hrdina jedné noci (1935)
 The Lantern (1938)
 Second Tour (1939)
 Muzikantská Liduška (1940)
 Barbora Hlavsová (1942)
 Valentin the Good (1942)
 The Respectable Ladies of Pardubice (1944)
 The Wedding Ring (1944 - music)
 A Kiss from the Stadium (1948)
 The Poacher's Foster Daughter or Noble Millionaire (1949)
 Temno (1950)
 May Events (1951)
 Hvězda jede na jih (1958)
 Lemonade Joe (1964)

References

External links
 

1899 births
1970 deaths
Male actors from Prague
People from the Kingdom of Bohemia
Czech male film actors
Czech male silent film actors
20th-century Czech male actors
Czech composers
Czech male composers
20th-century composers
20th-century Czech male musicians